Mykola Musolitin (born 21 January 1999) is a professional Ukrainian footballer who plays as a right-back for German club 1. CfR Pforzheim.

Club career
Musolitin is a product of youth team system of FC Chornomorets. Made his debut for FC Chornomorets in the game against FC Stal Kamianske on 1 October 2016 in the Ukrainian Premier League.

He is a son of Ukrainian footballer Volodymyr Musolitin.

International career
Musolitin was a part of the Ukraine national under-20 football team that won the 2019 FIFA U-20 World Cup.

Honours

International
Ukraine U20
FIFA U-20 World Cup: 2019

References

External links

1999 births
Footballers from Odesa
Living people
Ukrainian footballers
Ukraine youth international footballers
Association football defenders
FC Chornomorets Odesa players
FC Chornomorets-2 Odesa players
Valmieras FK players
Lechia Gdańsk players
Ukrainian Premier League players
Ukrainian First League players
Ukrainian Second League players
Latvian Higher League players
Ekstraklasa players
Oberliga (football) players
Ukrainian expatriate footballers
Expatriate footballers in Latvia
Ukrainian expatriate sportspeople in Latvia
Expatriate footballers in Poland
Ukrainian expatriate sportspeople in Poland
Expatriate footballers in Germany
Ukrainian expatriate sportspeople in Germany